The Technological University, Mandalay is located in the northern Mandalay near the Mandalay Hill in Mandalay, Myanmar. From 1955, the school was known as the Government Technical Institute. In August 1999, it was upgraded to a Government Technological College. In 2007, it was upgraded to the level of University. It now offers ten bachelor's degrees in engineering and architecture. The duration of the courses is 6 years. The Technological University offers Graduate Degree. Now, the University has attending 3000 students.

Programmes

Departments
Information Technology Department
Electrical Power Engineering Department
Civil Engineering Department
Electronics Engineering Department
Mechatronics Engineering Department
Mechanical  Engineering Department
Chemical Engineering Department
Architecture Department
Petroleum Engineering Department
Mining Engineering Department

Others
In final year,6 B.E., students have to do thesis and projects.

See also
Mandalay Technological University
List of Technological Universities in Myanmar

Technological universities in Myanmar